Anna Menon is an American engineer scheduled to fly on Polaris Dawn, a private space mission. Menon worked for NASA for seven years before joining SpaceX, where she works as a lead engineer of space operations.

Education
Menon earned a Bachelor of mathematics and Spanish degree from Texas Christian University and a Master of Science degree in biomedical engineering from Duke University.

Career

NASA

Menon was a NASA biomedical flight controller for the International Space Station, assisting ISS crews from NASA's Johnson Space Center in Houston, Texas, and leading biomedical operations for Expedition 41 including ISS US EVA's 27 and 28.

SpaceX
Menon is a Mission Director at SpaceX, where she helps the development of SpaceX crewed spaceflight missions and works at SpaceX headquarters in Hawthorne, California. She manages the execution of Dragon manufacturing and operates as Crew Communications Operator.

Menon is scheduled to fly on Polaris Dawn, a private spaceflight funded by billionaire Jared Isaacman. The mission is expected to launch from Kennedy Space Center Launch Complex 39A no earlier than March 2023.

Personal life
Menon is married to Anil Menon, lieutenant colonel in the United States Air Force, NASA astronaut candidate and a former SpaceX Medical Director. They have two children. Both she and her husband appeared in the final episode of the five-episode television documentary entitled Countdown: Inspiration4 Mission to Space, released on Netflix in September 2021.

References

See also 
 Polaris program

Living people
American astronauts
Commercial astronauts
Space tourists
SpaceX people
NASA people
Inspiration4
Year of birth missing (living people)